Sporting Club Thamesmead F.C. is an English football club located in Thamesmead in the London Borough of Bexley. The club is affiliated to the Kent Football Association.

Formed in 1900 as Royal Ordnance Factories Sports Association (ROFSA), in 1966 they changed their name to Royal Arsenal Sports and Recreation Association (RASRA). From 2003 until 2011, the team was known as Seven Acre Sports, before being renamed as Seven Acre & Sidcup on moving to Oxford Road in Sidcup. The club's current name was adopted in 2016, following a further move to the Sporting Club Thamesmead sports complex in 2014.

History
Formed in 1900 the club played in several south London leagues before joining the South London Alliance. During its time there  the club often moved between its Premier Division and First Division. After many cup wins over the years and following winning the Division One title at the end of the 2008–09 campaign, Seven Acres refused promotion to the Premier Division and joined the Kent County League in Division Two West.

In 2010 the moved from their home of Abbey Wood to Sidcup, adopting a new name, and in 2011-12 was accepted to become one of the founder members of the Kent Invicta Football League at level 10 of the English football league system for its inaugural season.

In its penultimate season in Sidcup the Beckenham Hospitals Cup was won again in Chislehurst versus Tudor Sports.

For the 2014-15 season the club made the big step to groundshare with Thamesmead Town at their Bayliss Avenue home. This cemented our position in the Kent Invicta League and saw the club enter the FA Vase that season and the FA Cup the following season.

The committee then decided to push on like never before for the 2016-17 season as another name change saw us become Sporting Club Thamesmead FC. This was to reach out even more to the local community.

2018 saw the newly named club claim its first silverware as the Hospitals Charity Cup was won again. This time by beating Phoenix Sports Reserves at Park View Road.

Colours
SC Thamesmead's colours are black and red striped shirts, with black shorts and socks sponsored by B&W Engineering The away kit is yellow and dark blue shirts, with dark blue shorts and socks also sponsored by B&W Engineering.

Grounds

1900 to 2010 the club played at the Seven Acre ground in Abbey Wood.
2011 - 2014 the club played at Oxford Road, Sidcup.
Since the 2014/15 season, the club have played their home games at the Sporting Club Thamesmead set up at Bayliss Avenue, London. Originally groundsharing with Thamesmead Town F.C., this enabled the club to compete in the FA step 6 (then named) Kent Invicta League and FA national cups. The reserve and vets teams play on the adjacent 4G pitch. The clubs spiritual homes are Oxford Road, Sidcup and the Seven Acre ground in Abbey Wood.

Honours

League honours
South London Football Alliance Division One:
 Winners (1): 2008–09

Cup honours
South London Football Alliance Queen Mary Charity Cup: winners 2007, 2008
 Runners Up (1): 2008–09
Beckenham Hospitals Cup: winners - 2013
Erith Hospitals Charity Cup: winners - 2007, 2018

Records
FA Cup
Preliminary Round 2015–16
FA Vase
Second round proper 2016-17 season
Highest league position: 5th in Kent Invicta Football League 2012–13.

References

External links

Football clubs in England
Football clubs in London
South London Football Alliance
Kent County League
Kent Invicta Football League
Southern Counties East Football League
Association football clubs established in 1900
1900 establishments in England
Sport in the London Borough of Bexley